Zoran Jovanovski (born 21 August 1972 in Skopje) is a Macedonian retired football defender.

International career
He made his senior debut for Macedonia in an October 1993 friendly match away against Slovenia, which was his country's first ever official match, and has earned a total of 29 caps, scoring no goals. His final international was an October 2001 FIFA World Cup qualification match against Slovakia.

Personal life
He is a twin brother of Goran Jovanovski.

References

External links
 
 
 
 

1972 births
Living people
Footballers from Skopje
Macedonian twins
Twin sportspeople
Association football central defenders
Yugoslav footballers
Macedonian footballers
North Macedonia international footballers
FK Vardar players
Helsingborgs IF players
SK Dynamo České Budějovice players
FK Bashkimi players
FK Sloga Jugomagnat players
Samsunspor footballers
FK Rabotnički players
FK Milano Kumanovo players
FK Teteks players
FK Metalurg Skopje players
Yugoslav First League players
Macedonian First Football League players
Allsvenskan players
Czech First League players
Macedonian Second Football League players
Süper Lig players
Macedonian expatriate footballers
Expatriate footballers in Sweden
Macedonian expatriate sportspeople in Sweden
Expatriate footballers in the Czech Republic
Macedonian expatriate sportspeople in the Czech Republic
Expatriate footballers in Turkey
Macedonian expatriate sportspeople in Turkey